Kristi Hager (born November 9, 1963) is a former member of the Iowa House of Representatives from the Iowa House, District 56. A resident of Waukon, she has served as a Republican in the Iowa House of Representatives since January 2017. Hager has lived much of her life in Allamakee County, Iowa.

Hager served on the following committees in the Iowa House of Representatives: Education, Local Government (Vice Chair), Public Safety, and Transportation.

In February 2018, she announced she would not seek reelection and left office in January 2019 when her term ended.

References

External links
Official site on Republican Party's page

Republican Party members of the Iowa House of Representatives
Living people
People from Winneshiek County, Iowa
University of Dubuque alumni
21st-century American politicians
1963 births